The Abkhazian Cup is the foremost association football cup competition in Abkhazia. The tournament is held annually, with football clubs competing from the Abkhazian Premier League. The cup competition is not an officially recognized tournament by FIFA or any of its confederations. It is overseen by the Football Federation of Abkhazia.

List of champions

References 

Football in Abkhazia
Football competitions in Georgia (country)